James Rosco Nix (born 1947) was director of the Ellen G. White Estate from 2000-2020. As a young person he developed a collection of rare early Seventh-day Adventist materials and interviewed individuals who remembered Ellen G. White. Nix is recognized as a consummate storyteller of early Adventism who has worked tirelessly to protect Ellen White's writings.

Education
Nix graduated in 1969 from La Sierra University with a dual major in history and theology. In 1972 he earned an M.Div. degree from Andrews University and a degree in library science.

Ellen G. White Estate
In 1972 Loma Linda University hired Nix to develop a Heritage Room of which he became director in 1974. Two years later he supervised the opening of an Ellen G. White Estate Research Center, which became a Branch Office of the White Estate in 1985. He was ordained as a Seventh-day Adventist minister in 1994 and became director of the Ellen G. White Estate in 2000. His leadership has been noted by his strong reticence to have Ellen G. White's unpublished writings made available. In 2015 Nix was responsible for opening a "world class" visitor center at the Seventh-day Adventist world church headquarters, the fulfillment of a lifelong dream. In 2020 he retired as director of the Ellen G. White Estate.

Adventist Heritage Ministry
In 1981 he co-founded Adventist Historic Properties, Inc., now known as Adventist Heritage Ministry, and currently serves as chair of its board. In 1994 he organized the sesquicentennial commemoration of the Great Disappointment held at the William Miller Farm. He has been intimately involved in the purchase of a series of historic properties owned by Adventist Heritage Ministry.

Personal life
James Rosco Nix married Mary K. Thesman and they later divorced in 1977. They have a daughter and one grandson. He married his second wife Mindi Nix and they reside in Maryland.

Publications
Nix has authored or contributed to several books including Early Advent Singing, Laughter and Tears of the Pioneers, and In the Footprints of the Pioneers. His writings are generally considered strongly apologetic and promote a hagiographical view of Adventist history.

See also 

 28 Fundamental Beliefs
 Adventism
 Adventist Heritage Ministry
 Conditional Immortality
 Historicism
 History of the Seventh-day Adventist Church
 Inspiration of Ellen G. White
 Investigative judgment
 Pillars of Adventism
 Prophecy in the Seventh-day Adventist Church
 Questions on Doctrine
 Sabbath in seventh-day churches
 Second Coming
 Seventh-day Adventist Church
 Seventh-day Adventist Church Pioneers
 Seventh-day Adventist eschatology
 Seventh-day Adventist theology
 Seventh-day Adventist worship
 Teachings of Ellen G. White
 Three Angels' Messages

References

External links
 "The Light Still Shines" Devotional Talk by Jim Nix

Seventh-day Adventist religious workers
Living people
American Seventh-day Adventists
Ellen G. White Estate
Seventh-day Adventist administrators
History of the Seventh-day Adventist Church
History of Christianity in the United States
1947 births